Davidovo is a village in Northern Bulgaria. The village is located in Targovishte Municipality, Targovishte Province. Аccording to the numbers provided by the 2020 Bulgarian census, Davidovo currently has a population of 500 people with a permanent address registered in the settlement.

Geography 
Davidovo village is located in Municipality Targovishte. It lies 3 kilometers away from Targovishte and 127 kilometers away from Varna.

The village's elevation ranges between 100 and 199 meters and has an average elevation of 177 meters above sea level. The climate is continental.

The village is located between green hills and a river passes through it. There are clearly pronounced 4 seasons including a hot summer, cold winter, sunny spring, and dry autumn.

Infrastructure 
The roads in the village are in a good condition. The nearest school is located in Targovishte. 13 kilometers away from Davidovo village, water dam Saedinenie can be found.

Buildings 

 The local community center and library “Svetlina” were founded in 1927.
 There is a school for children with special needs. 
 There is a park in the village.
 Local church
 Post office
 Futboll field, Buggy race tracks, sport facilities

Ethnicity 
According to the Bulgarian population census in 2011.

References 

Villages_in_Targovishte_Province